Erwin de Vries (21 December 1929 – 31 January 2018) was a Surinamese painter and sculptor.

De Vries was born in Paramaribo, and is the half-brother of Henry Lucien de Vries, who served as governor of Suriname from 1965 until 1967. Wim Bos Verschuur, his art teacher, convinced his parents to sent him to the Netherlands to further his education. He studied at the Koninklijke Academie van Beeldende Kunsten in The Hague and at the Rijksacademie van Beeldende Kunsten in Amsterdam. De Vries's first exhibition was in 1948 in Paramaribo. His work has since been displayed at the Stedelijk Museum and the Kunsthal in Rotterdam. De Vries has also exhibited a great deal in Jamaica; there he became acquainted with the work of Barrington Watson, whose erotically charged paintings matched his own in tone.

References

Veerle Poupeye. Caribbean Art.  London; Thames and Hudson; 1998.

External links
Biographical research into the life and work of the Surinamese artist Erwin de Vries

1929 births
2018 deaths
Surinamese painters
Surinamese sculptors
People from Paramaribo